Lemon pepper (also called lemon pepper seasoning) is a seasoning made from granulated lemon zest and cracked black peppercorns. The lemon zest is mashed with the pepper to allow the citrus oil to infuse into the pepper. This mix is then baked and dried and can be used on meats (particularly poultry) and pasta, although it was originally used primarily for seafood. 

Lemon pepper is generally commercially available in small jars, although it may also be homemade. Commercially available lemon pepper may also include smaller amounts of other ingredients such as salt, sugar, onion, garlic, citric acid, additional lemon flavor, cayenne pepper, and other spices.

References

Herb and spice mixtures
Lemons